The 1909 election for Mayor of Los Angeles took place on November 9, 1909, with a run-off election on December 7, 1909. Incumbent George Alexander was re-elected over George A. Smith in the runoff election.

Municipal elections in California, including Mayor of Los Angeles, are officially nonpartisan; candidates' party affiliations do not appear on the ballot.

Election 
Incumbent George Alexander won the March 1909 Los Angeles mayoral election to finish Arthur C. Harper's term, and was now seeking a full term. He was challenged by George A. Smith, a fellow Republican and former Councilman, William C. Mushet, an Independent who was the Los Angeles City Auditor, and Oscar Eugene Farish, a Democrat and former Councilman.

In the primary, Smith and Mushet were close in totals to be included on the ballot for the runoff election, and some Mushet supporters floated the idea of Smith withdrawing to allow Mushet on the ballot. In the results, Smith had a lead by a small margin, placing him on the ballot. After the results of the primary were released, Mushet sued for a recount, alleging misconduct in every precinct. A month later, he stated that he had "failed to gain a place on the ballot partly because of a defect in the primary election law."

In the general election, Alexander defeated Smith with a majority vote.

Results

Primary election

General election

References and footnotes

External links
 Office of the City Clerk, City of Los Angeles

1909 November
1909 California elections
Los Angeles
1900s in Los Angeles